Nuance may refer to:
 Nuance Communications, company that sells voice and productivity software
 Music:
 Nuance (American band), 1980s dance music group
 Nuance (Canadian band), 1980s pop rock group from Quebec